Decimus may refer to:

Romen praenomen 
 Decimus (praenomen)
 Decimus Carfulenus (died 43 BC), Roman statesman
 Decimus Haterius Agrippa (died 32 AD), consul in 22 AD
 Decimus Junius Brutus (consul 77 BC)
 Decimus Junius Brutus Albinus (–43 BC), Roman politician and general, assassin of Julius Caesar
 Decimus Junius Brutus Callaicus (180 BC–113 BC), Roman politician and general
 Decimus Junius Silanus Torquatus (16 AD–64 AD), consul in AD 53
 Decimus Junius Silanus (consul)
 Decimus Junius Silanus (translator of Mago)
 Decimus Laberius (–43 BC), Roman eques and writer
 Decimus Laelius, Roman lawyer and tribune of the plebs
 Decimus Laelius Balbus, consul in 6 BC
 Decimus Valerius Asiaticus (–47 AD), Roman senator
 Decimus Valerius Asiaticus (Legatus) (35-after 69 AD), Roman senator, Legatus of Gallia Belgica
 Ausonius (Decimus Magnus Ausonius, –), Roman poet and rhetorician
 Balbinus (Decimus Caelius Calvinus Balbinus, –238), Roman emperor in 238
 Clodius Albinus (–197), Roman usurper
 Juvenal (Decimus Junius Juvenalis), poet of the 1st century AD

Given name 
 Decimus Burton (1800–1881), English architect
 Decimus Govett (1827–1912), Anglican priest

Pen-name
 Thomas Chatterton (1752–1780), English poet